Susan Scher Weiner (c. 1946 – August 11, 2012) was a politician from Georgia, USA, and was the first woman to become Mayor of Savannah. She was a Republican.

Background

Weiner, who was Jewish, was born as Susan Scher in Albany, New York and graduated from SUNY New Paltz. She moved to Savannah in the mid-1980s.

Political career

Weiner ran for Mayor of Savannah in 1991.  She won the Republican nomination without opposition and defeated five-term incumbent and Democratic nominee John Rousakis with 54% of the vote. She conducted a law and order campaign in which she promised to address local crime issues.  She also advocated "privatizing some city services, such as sanitation, garbage collection, road maintenance and recreational facility maintenance."

Weiner was the first woman mayor of Savannah.

Under her tenure, six council members were Democrats; only two were Republicans.  Eventually, Weiner abandoned most proposals from her platform. In 1995, she was narrowly defeated by Councilor Floyd Adams Jr., a Democrat and an African-American.

Later life and death

Weiner was a trainer for the Coverdell Leadership Institute from 1996 to 2004. In 2004, then Governor Sonny Perdue appointed her as executive director of the Georgia Council for the Arts.

Weiner died from complications of cancer in Gainesville, Georgia on August 11, 2012 at the age of 66.

See also
 List of mayors of Savannah, Georgia
 List of first women mayors in the United States

Footnotes

External links
Mayor's official site

2012 deaths
Mayors of Savannah, Georgia
Women mayors of places in Georgia (U.S. state)
Jewish mayors of places in the United States
Jewish women politicians
Year of birth uncertain
Jewish American people in Georgia (U.S. state) politics
Politicians from Albany, New York
Georgia (U.S. state) Republicans
Jews and Judaism in Savannah
21st-century American Jews
21st-century American women